Mirtemir Tursunov (May 30, 1910 - January 25, 1978) most commonly known simply as Mirtemir, was an Uzbek poet and literary translator. In addition to writing his own poetry, Mirtemir translated the works of many famous foreign poets, such as Abai Qunanbaiuli, Aleksandr Pushkin, Heinrich Heine, Magtymguly Pyragy, Maxim Gorky, Mikhail Lermontov, Nâzım Hikmet, Nikolay Nekrasov, Pablo Neruda, Samad Vurgun, and Shota Rustaveli into the Uzbek language.

Mirtemir became a National Poet of the Uzbek SSR in 1971. He received many other awards for his works, including the State Berdaq Prize (1977) and the State Hamza Prize (1979). In 2002, Mirtemir was posthumously awarded the National Order of Merit, one of independent Uzbekistan's most prestigious awards.

Life and work
Mirtemir Umarbekovich Tursunov was born on May 30, 1910, in the village of Ikan, Turkistan. In 1932, Mirtemir graduated from the Pedagogical University of Samarkand with a degree in literature.

Mirtemir's first collection of poems, Shuʼlalar qoʻynida (Under the Lights) was published in 1928. His other collections of poetry include Zafar (Victory) (1929), Qaynashlarim (My Rages), Bong (The Clamor) (1932), and Poytaxt (The Capital) (1936).

Mirtemir translated the works of many famous foreign poets, such as Abai Qunanbaiuli, Aleksandr Pushkin, Berdaq, Heinrich Heine, Magtymguly Pyragy, Maxim Gorky, Mikhail Lermontov, Nâzım Hikmet, Nikolay Nekrasov, Pablo Neruda, Samad Vurgun, and Shota Rustaveli into Uzbek. In particular, he translated Who is Happy in Russia? of Nikolay Nekrasov and The Man in the Panther's Skin of Shota Rustaveli into Uzbek. He also translated the Kyrgyz epic poem Manas.

An example of his work, written originally in Cyrillic alphabet:
This is my mother tongue, the language of my dear mother. It permeated my soul and ear since I was in the cradle. This is the language of my people, my homeland, and my folks. In life time it is as old as mother earth.

Mirtemir died in Tashkent on 25 January 1978, at the age of 67.

References

1910 births
1978 deaths
People from Turkistan Region
Uzbeks
20th-century Uzbekistani poets
Uzbekistani translators
Translators from Russian
Translators to Uzbek
Soviet poets
20th-century male writers
20th-century translators
Uzbekistani male poets
Soviet male poets